CREB-regulated transcription coactivator 1 (CRTC1), previously referred to as TORC1 (Transducer Of Regulated CREB activity 1),  is a protein that in humans is encoded by the CRTC1 gene. It is expressed in a limited number of tissues that include fetal brain and liver and adult heart, skeletal muscles, liver and salivary glands and various regions of the adult central nervous system.

Clinical significance 

Production of CRTC1 is blocked in Alzheimer's disease.

See also 
Transcription coregulator

References

Further reading

External links 

 

Gene expression
Transcription coregulators
Immunology
Alzheimer's disease research